29 East 32nd Street (also known as the Old Grolier Club or Gilbert Kiamie House) in New York City was originally the Grolier Club building when it was built in 1889. Its architecture by Charles W. Romeyn is considered to be Richardsonian Romanesque.

It is now called the Madison and became a New York City designated landmark in 1970.

See also
 List of New York City Designated Landmarks in Manhattan from 14th to 59th Streets
 National Register of Historic Places listings in Manhattan from 14th to 59th Streets

References

External links

Clubhouses on the National Register of Historic Places in Manhattan
Commercial buildings completed in 1889
Richardsonian Romanesque architecture in New York City
New York City Designated Landmarks in Manhattan